Long Odds is a 1922 British sports drama film directed by A.E. Coleby and starring Edith Bishop, Sam Marsh and Garry Marsh.

Cast
 A.E. Coleby:  Gus Granville
 Edith Bishop:  Sally Walters
 Sam Marsh:  Jim Straker
 Fred Paul:  Hastings Floyd
 Sam Austin:  Tony Walters
 Henry Nicholls-Bates:  Sam Marshall
 Frank Wilson:  Ned Boulter
 Madge Royce:  Mrs. Granville
 Garry Marsh:  Pat Malone

References

External links

1922 films
British horse racing films
1920s sports drama films
British sports drama films
British silent feature films
British black-and-white films
1922 drama films
1920s English-language films
1920s British films
Silent sports drama films